Cape Hooker is a cape on the northeastern portion of the peninsula which includes Davis Ice Piedmont, on the north coast of Victoria Land, Antarctica.Cape Dayman lies situated to the immediate east-southeast, forming an outer entrance point to Yule Bay. This headland was first discovered by Captain James Clark Ross in 1841, who named it for Joseph Dalton Hooker (later Sir Joseph), naturalist and assistant surgeon on the Erebus who became internationally famous as a botanist. This headland lies situated on the Pennell Coast, a portion of Antarctica lying between Cape Williams and Cape Adare.

References

Headlands of Victoria Land
Pennell Coast